is a video game for the Super Famicom game console based on the popular Popeye franchise, specifically in The All-New Popeye Hour. It was released by Technos Japan on August 12, 1994 exclusively in Japan.

Plot 
After countless defeats at the hands of Popeye, the evil Seahag has devised a fool proof plan for revenge.  She turns all of Popeye's friends into stone by removing their hearts and scattering the pieces across the corresponding islands.  Now Popeye must search for the hearts within each of five islands in order to revive them.  It won't be easy, as General Bunzo and his troops has issued a "100,000,000G" bounty for the hearts.  This prompts the likes of Bolo, Ox to try and collect the hearts for the reward.  Upon reading this, Brutus decides to quest for the hearts as well in a plan to impress Olive.  Thus making this a race against time for Popeye to save his friends and put a stop to Seahag's plan.

Gameplay 
As Popeye, players will have to fight their way through different villains such as Bolo, Ox, Emok, General Bunzo and his troops, Bernard the Buzzard, the boss for most levels Brutus, and the main boss Seahag.

Stages 
The game's stages feature large maps that appear in the form of a board game in which the player will have to take turns moving around, explore each of its spaces, and obtain the hearts of Popeye's frozen friends. There are also spaces that serve different purposes throughout the game.  The beginning of each stage starts with by showing the player which character will have to be saved. Their heart the rises skyward and splits into various pieces, those pieces then scatter onto random spaces of the map which the space will appear as an enclosed heart. When on the map, the player presses the action button a wheel will appear with spaces numbered 1-6 which will help determine the player's moves throughout the game.

Courses 
The areas on the map are referred to as courses.  Courses appear in the form of a side scrolling platformer which players will have to complete in the allotted time given.  Players must explore various courses in order to obtain the hearts.  In some cases players will have to explore some course in order to reveal hidden pathways and shortcuts.

Abilities 
For the most part Popeye's primary weapon is a large anchor and chain which he carries on his shoulder and uses like a bolo whip. Popeye can obtain power-ups for support, such as a tire to bowl over enemies, a propeller anchor for reaching high platforms, and a "KeroKero" (meaning "ribbit ribbit") which allows the player to become a frog for better maneuverability in water courses. There are also items that inflict damage to people on the map such as a bomb (Bakudan) and lighting anchor (BuriBuri). During boss battles Popeye can obtain spinach to give the player invincibility and ability to use their fist near the end of the battle.

External links
 Popeye: Ijiwaru Majo Seahag no Maki at SNES Music

1994 video games
Japan-exclusive video games
Ijiwaru Majo Shihaggu no Maki
Super Nintendo Entertainment System games
Super Nintendo Entertainment System-only games
Technōs Japan games
Video games developed in Japan 
Video games about witchcraft